The Jangal (Jungle) Movement, in Gilan, was a rebellion against the monarchist rule of the central government of Sublime State of Iran, which lasted from 1915 to 1921.

History of the movement
In 1915, Mirza Kuchik Khan, an experienced activist in the Constitutional Revolution, launched  the Jangal movement, which was religiously Islamic, in the forests of Gilan, demanding autonomous status for the province, an end to central government corruption, an end to foreign interference in affairs of local peoples, and land reform. Basically, even though the movement was not "separatist", "bourgeois nationalist", or communist, its main ideas were rooted in ridding the country of government corruption, "foreign imperial domination," and opposition to the country's existing monarchy. With such goals, it is no surprise that the movement enjoyed strong support of the peasantry, working class, and poor population within Iran. Even so, Hooshang Amirahmadi describes the movement's leaders as "merchants and landlords" and Mirza as part of the "democratic wing" of the Iranian bourgeoisie.

In years that followed, the movement's guerrillas, Jangalis, fought against foreign invaders. While they were described as "small landowners in Gilan" that advocated armed insurgency, they were strong enough to resist the advances of the Russian Empire, leading the British to become the major military presence in the region instead. After the Russian Revolution in 1917, Marxists within Iran became more organized and began collaborating with the Jangal movement, with many of these new revolutionaries directly influenced by the Bolsheviks. Later, these Marxists would end up forming the communist Tudeh Party. Even so, there were undoubtedly differences since Mirza supported land reforms but not land redistribution.

Near the end of 1917, the Jangalis organized a "Unity of Islam" committee, since they were affiliated with the Union of Islam movement, which was "bourgeois-nationalist" with democratic elements, with members on the committee mainly comprising landlords and merchants. Still, they drew up a proposed constitution which accepted "private property in land" with certain limitations but also called for equality, majority rule, and freedom. Even with this, the Jangalis failed to change relations between landlords and peasants, but they did continue to hold an anti-absolutist, anti-imperialist, and nationalist position displayed in their newspaper, Jangal, launched in 1917. In years that followed, it was clear that the movement was gaining strength as disorder and insecurity swept the country.

By 1920, the Jangalis, who were broadly Shia Muslims, engaged in an uprising in which they demanded regional autonomy and national reforms. There was a turning point in the movement after the Red Army came into the Iranian port of Enzali. As a result, the Red Army and Jangalis agreed on the establishment of the bourgeois democratic and anti-British/anti-imperialist government in Gilan, while Mirza began secret negotiations with the central government to eliminate communists, leading to a coup in the Gilan government and later peace between the two forces.

After this, the Jangalis were a key part of maintaining Socialist Soviet Republic of Gilan, showing that Marxists and Muslims could work together in a common cause. John Foran describes this collaboration:

The Communist Party of Iran, led by Haydar Khan Amoughlu, and the Jungle Movement, led by Mirza Kuchak Khan, had formed an alliance to build a soviet socialist republic. In addition, they sent a letter to Lenin asking for assistance in 'freeing us and all of the oppressed from the chain of Iranian and British oppressors.' They also sent a letter to Tehran proclaiming the monarch government illegitimate.

This Soviet republic would last close to two years before its leaders were killed and imprisoned. While the Soviet role in Iran was not clear, with questions on whether they were helping Iranians or helping establish a Soviet Republic in the country, there is no doubt that "Marxist-Muslim cooperation" as part of the Soviet Republic had a long-standing legacy on political and socialist organizing in the country, with one group of students organizing against the Shah in the 1960s  called the "Jangal Group."

Further analysis
Initially, when commencing the movement, Mirza and his allies formed a union called Ettehad-e-Islam (The Islamic Union). Although in the beginning, they were in conformity over the aims of the movement, eventually the movement began witnessing considerable friction as some members had diverging tendencies toward Ahmad Shah Qajar while others such as Mirza specifically called for an Iranian "Republic."

Not only did Mirza specifically use the term "Republic of Iran," as can be seen in his letters, but he had also declared his interest in a "Republic" before the advent of the Communist Party of Iran. In fact Mirza was removed from his posts in the Persian Socialist Soviet Republic only 17 days after the party's formation. Mirza did not seem to agree with Marxist ideology, being a devout man of faith, even though many of his allies until the end were members of the Communist Party.

The British did not take Mirza's successes lightly, and sent intelligence agent Edward Noel to assassinate Mirza. Noel was arrested before he could take any such action. Colonel Stokes and General Lionel Dunsterville (whose troops were lightly referred to as Dunsterforce) were further agitated by Mirza's refusal to let British forces pass through Gilan on their way up north, while Mirza had approved and guaranteed Russian troops returning north safe passage. British forces attacked Rasht as a result, and even bombed Mirza's residence using airplanes. An ultimatum was issued to Mirza by the British to surrender.

The Russians joined the British and sent in 20,000 troops to capture Mirza. Many prominent members of the movement such as Haj Ahmad Kasmai, and Dr Talequani Heshmat surrendered, with 270 troops, and the latter was executed by the Qajar government despite the immunity that he was granted.

In 1922, the Soviets came to an agreement with the Iranian government to withdraw their troops, especially those assisting the Gilan Republic, and soon after the British declared they would be withdrawing their troops. Ultimately, the Soviets told Mirza that the Soviet Republic, due to changed circumstances, was compromised. As a result, there was an internal conflict in which the leader of the communists, Heidar Amou Oqli, was killed, the "Revolutionary Committee" of the Soviet Republic fell apart, the Jangalis were defeated by Reza Khan and Mirza, along with his German companion, froze to death as they tried to escape Khan's men.

See also
Jungle Party
Persian Socialist Soviet Republic
Persian Constitutional Revolution

References

Other reading

Ebrahim Fakhrayi, Sardar-e Jangal (The Commander of the Jangalis), Tehran: Javidan,1983.
Gregor Yaghikiyan, Shooravi and Jonbesh-e Jangal (The Soviet Union and the Jangali Movement), Editor: Borzouyeh Dehgan, Tehran: Novin, 1984.
 Khosro Shākeri, Milāde Zakhm: Jonbesh-e Jangal va Jomhuri-ye Shoravi-ye Socialist-e Iran in Persian, first edition, 715 p. (Akhtarān Press, Tehran, 2007).  .  Published in English as Cosroe Chaqueri The Soviet Socialist Republic of Iran, 1920-21: Birth of the Trauma (Pitt Series in Russian and East European Studies, University of Pittsburgh Press, 1994), .  
Haghshenas, Seyyed Ali, Movement of Jangal,  result of incomplete Constitutional Revolution  (owjnews Agency).

Rebellions in Iran
1910s in Iran
Iran–Soviet Union relations
History of Gilan
Cold War history of Iran
Iranian civil wars
Politics of Qajar Iran
Revolutions of 1917–1923
History of Talysh